Nkoranza North is one of the constituencies represented in the Parliament of Ghana. It elects one Member of Parliament (MP) by the first past the post system of election. Nkoranza North is located in the Nkoranza district of the Bono East Region of Ghana.

This seat was created prior to the  Ghanaian parliamentary election in 2004 and has been held by the New Patriotic Party since then.

At the by-election held on 13 March 2007, the New Patriotic Party (NPP) candidate, Derek Oduro, won the seat with an increased majority.

Boundaries 
The seat is located entirely within the Nkoranza district of the Bono East Region of Ghana. It covers the northern part of the district. To the south is the Nkoranza South constituency. Its western boundary is the Techiman North constituency in the Techiman Municipal District. To the north is Kintampo South constituency in the Kintampo South District and the Pru constituency in the Pru District is north east. The eastern boundary is formed by the Atebubu Amantin constituency in the Atebubu-Amantin District. The south eastern boundary is formed by the Ejura Sekyedumase constituency in the  Ejura/Sekyedumase District of the Ashanti Region.

History 
The constituency was first created in 2004 by the Electoral Commission of Ghana along with 29 other new ones, increasing the number of constituencies from 200 to 230.

Members of Parliament

Elections

See also 
 List of Ghana Parliament constituencies

References 

Parliamentary constituencies in the Bono East Region
2004 establishments in Ghana